John Robert 'Bertie' Peacock MBE (29 September 1928 – 22 July 2004) was a Northern Ireland international footballer and manager who played for Celtic.

Playing career
After starting his career with local side Coleraine F.C., Peacock moved on to Belfast club Glentoran in 1947. After two years he was signed by Glasgow club, Celtic, where he would go on to become captain and a club legend. During his time at the club he won one league title, two Scottish Cups and two Scottish League Cups. In 1962, he played in the Eastern Canada Professional Soccer League with Hamilton Steelers, where he served as a player-coach.

Peacock won 31 caps for Northern Ireland. He featured alongside Harry Gregg, Danny Blanchflower and Billy Bingham in the team that reached the last eight in the 1958 World Cup, the country's furthest progress to date.

Managerial career
Peacock became Northern Ireland manager a year after his retirement as a footballer in 1961, giving George Best his first start. In the 1960s he returned to Coleraine, winning the Irish League title in 1974. Peacock briefly came out of retirement when he came on as a substitute against Shamrock Rovers in the Texaco Cup in September 1971. It was his last game for Coleraine as they lost 3–0 at The Showgrounds (Coleraine).

He was also assistant manager to Billy Bingham during Northern Ireland's  1982 World Cup campaign, where they famously knocked out hosts Spain in Valencia.

Later life and legacy
Alongside Jim Weir and Victor Leonard, Peacock was one of the founders of the Milk Cup. Held in his native Coleraine, the youth football competition started with sixteen teams in 1982 and rose to become one of the most respected tournaments in the world.

In 1986 he was awarded the MBE for his services to football. He died in 2004, aged 76.

In June 2006 a statue of Peacock was commissioned. The memorial stands in Coleraine and was unveiled by Pat Jennings in July 2007, at the opening of the 25th Milk Cup.

Also in 2006, a youth football club was formed in his honour: Bertie Peacocks Youths. This club has a range of teams from under-7 to under-16. In only two years, the teams have been very successful - the under-11s in particular, winning the Down and Connor League, the Down and Connor Knock-Out Cup and becoming Northern Ireland Boys Champions all in the 2008 season. This club has had much encouragement from the wide supporters of Bertie Peacock.

Honours

Player
Coleraine
Blaxnit Cup: 1969

Celtic
Scottish Football League: 1953–54
Scottish Cup: 1950–51, 1953–54
Scottish League Cup: 1956–57, 1957–58

Manager
Coleraine
Irish League: 1973–74

References

1928 births
2004 deaths
Association footballers from Northern Ireland
Football managers from Northern Ireland
Northern Ireland international footballers
Northern Ireland national football team managers
Coleraine F.C. players
Celtic F.C. players
1958 FIFA World Cup players
Glentoran F.C. players
Hamilton Steelers (ECPSL) players
Members of the Order of the British Empire
People from Coleraine, County Londonderry
NIFL Premiership players
Association football defenders
Eastern Canada Professional Soccer League players
Association football player-managers
Scottish Football League players
Sportspeople from County Londonderry